Mayra Goñi (better known as Mayra) is a Peruvian actress and singer. Yuru portrayed in the miniseries "Yuru: La princesa de la selva". In 2012 Goñi won the reality show "Operación Triunfo". In 2013 Goñi released her first album called "Parece Amor" which showed her first single called "Horas".

Albums 
2013: Parece Amor

Singles 
2013: Horas

Singles 
2020: Victima

TV 
2007: Yuru: La princesa amazónica. Yuru
2008: Magnolia Merino... Wendy Solis
2011: Eva. Rosa Ayllón
2012: La faraona... Marisol (adolescent)
2012–2013: Solamente Milagros
2013: Conversando Con La Luna
2014: La Mujer Boa

Realities 
2012: Operación Triunfo... Winner

Cine 
2012: El buen Pedro... Susan
2017: Av. Larco, La Película... La Prima

References

External links 

Living people
21st-century Peruvian actresses
21st-century Peruvian women singers
21st-century Peruvian singers
Singers from Lima
Year of birth missing (living people)
Peruvian television actresses
Actresses from Lima
Reality television participants
Peruvian film actresses
Peruvian child models
Peruvian YouTubers